Kengeri railway station (station code: KGI) is a major railway station within city limits of Bangalore City on the Mysore–Bangalore railway line. It is one of the major developing railway station in the city of Bangalore in the Indian State of Karnataka. It is the fourth largest railway station in the Indian city of Bangalore after Ksr Bangalore City Railway Station, Yeshwantpur Jn.Railway Station, Bangalore Cantt.Railway Station.It is one of the major stations in Bangalore developing for reducing the rush at Yeshvantpur JN. and Bangalore City railway station.

Location 
It serves Kengeri & Kengeri Satellite Town a neighborhoods in Bangalore in the western part of the city. It is a popular railway station among residents of west Bengaluru because of its good connectivity with the Namma Metro Purple Line and the BMTC and a BMTC bus stand being constructed right next to it, usually to avoid the traffic of the roads as well of the passengers in the Bangalore Cantt.Railway Station,KSR Bengaluru City Railway Station and the Yeshwanthpur Jn. Railway Station.

Infrastructure 
The station consists of four platforms. It has five ticket counters and two digital ticket kiosks in the terminus. It has digital sign board. It has a digital large clock in the first platform. It has a number of stalls for food and a Nandini milk parlour. It also has IRCTC Stall. It has two public toilets one in the first platform and the other in the second and third platforms. The second and third platforms are covered with an overhead shelter. It has a foot overbridge over the train tracks connecting all the platforms. It also has a free Wi-Fi service provided by Google Station. The second and third platforms have electronic boards to mention a train's number, the class of the bogie which is going to stop at that point a couple of moments before the train's arrival. It has newly established LED TV's for the info of the train to the passengers. It has a large space for two wheeler 4 wheeler and bicycle parking. It has six ticket counters to book tickets.

Line 
The station is on the Mysore – KSR Bangalore City JN railway line & Mysore - Yeshvantpur JN railway line. Platforms 3 and 4 serves for trains going towards Mysuru Railway Station and platforms 1 and 2 serves for trains going towards KSR Bengaluru City Railway Station and Yeshvantpur JN Railway Station

See also 
 Mysore–Bangalore railway line

References

Railway stations in Bangalore Urban district
Railway stations in Bangalore
Bangalore railway division